Luigi Mosca (1775 – 30 November 1824) was Italian composer of operas and sacred music and a noted singing teacher. He composed eighteen operas, most of which were originally for theatres in Naples, but played throughout Italy in their day.

Biography
Mosca was born in Naples and studied at the Pietà dei Turchini Conservatory there. Like his elder brother Giuseppe Mosca (also an opera composer), he studied composition under Fedele Fenaroli.

Works

Operas
L'impresario burlato (opera buffa, libretto by Francesco Antonio Signoretti, Teatro Nuovo, Naples, 1797)
La sposa tra le imposture (opera buffa, libretto by Francesco Antonio Signoretti, Teatro Nuovo, Naples, 1798) 
Un imbroglio ne porta un altro (opera buffa, libretto by Giuseppe Palomba, Teatro Nuovo, Naples,  1799)
Gli sposi in cimento (opera buffa, libretto by Francesco Saverio Zini, Teatro Nuovo, Naples, 1800)
L'omaggio sincero (musical allegory in honour of Ferdinand I of the Two Sicilies, libretto by Giuseppe Pagliuca, Teatro del Palazzo Reale, Naples, 1800)
Le stravaganze d'amore (opera buffa, libretto by Francesco Saverio Zini, Teatro Nuovo, Naples, 1800)
Gli amanti volubili (opera buffa, libretto by Jacopo Ferretti, Teatro Valle, Rome, 1801)
L'amore per inganno (L'amoroso inganno; La cantatrice di spirito) (opera buffa, libretto by Giuseppe Palomba, Teatro dei Fiorentini, Naples, 1801)
Il ritorno impensato (Il ritorno inaspettato) (opera buffa, libretto by Francesco Saverio Zini, Teatro dei Fiorentini, Naples, 1802)
L'impostore ossia Il Marcotondo (opera buffa, libretto by Andrea Leone Tottola, Teatro Nuovo, Naples, 1802)
La vendetta femminina (opera buffa, Teatro dei Fiorentini, Naples, 1803; as La lezione vendetta, Théâtre-Italien, Paris, 1806)
Gli zingari in fiera (opera buffa, libretto by Giuseppe Palomba, Genoa, 1806)
I finti viaggiatori (opera buffa, libretto by Nicasio De Mase, Teatro dei Fiorentini, Naples, 1807)
L'italiana in Algeri (opera buffa, libretto by Angelo Anelli, La Scala, Milan, 1808)
La sposa a sorte (opera buffa, libretto by Giuseppe Palomba, Teatro dei Fiorentini, Naples, 1810)
Il salto di Leucade (opera seria, libretto by Giovanni Schmidt, Teatro San Carlo, Naples, 1812)
L'audacia delusa (opera buffa, libretto by Giuseppe Palomba, Teatro dei Fiorentini, Naples, 1813)
Il bello piace a tutti (excerpt held in the Vatican Library)

Sources
de Rosa di Villarosa, Carlo Antonio (1840). "Mosca, Luigi" in Memorie dei compositori di musica del regno di Napoli. Stamperia reale 

Wier, Albert Ernest (ed.) (1938). "Mosca, Luigi" in The Macmillan Encyclopedia of Music and Musicians, Volume 2. The Macmillan Company

External links
Complete piano/vocal score of Mosca's aria, "Cara mia sposina" on the International Music Score Library Project

Italian classical composers
Italian male classical composers
Italian opera composers
Male opera composers
1775 births
1824 deaths
Musicians from Naples